Health technology assessment (HTA) is a multidisciplinary process that uses systematic and explicit methods to evaluate the properties and effects of a health technology. Health technology is conceived as any intervention (test, device, medicine, vaccine, procedure, program) at any point in its lifecycle (pre-market, regulatory approval, post-market, disinvestment). HTA aim is to inform "decision-making in order to promote an equitable, efficient, and high-quality health system".  It has other definitions including "a method of evidence synthesis that considers evidence regarding clinical effectiveness, safety, cost-effectiveness and, when broadly applied, includes social, ethical, and legal aspects of the use of health technologies. The precise balance of these inputs depends on the purpose of each individual HTA. A major use of HTAs is in informing reimbursement and coverage decisions by insurers and national health systems, in which case HTAs should include benefit-harm assessment and economic evaluation."  And "a multidisciplinary process that summarises information about the medical, social, economic and ethical issues related to the use of a health technology in a systematic, transparent, unbiased, robust manner. Its aim is to inform the formulation of safe, effective, health policies that are patient focused and seek to achieve best value. Despite its policy goals, HTA must always be firmly rooted in research and the scientific method".

Purpose
Health technology assessment is intended to provide a bridge between the world of research and the world of decision-making. HTA is an active field internationally and has seen continued growth fostered by the need to support management, clinical, and policy decisions. It has also been advanced by the evolution of evaluative methods in the social and applied sciences, including clinical epidemiology and health economics. Health policy decisions are becoming increasingly important as the opportunity costs from making wrong decisions continue to grow. HTA is now also used in assessment of innovative medical technologies like telemedicine e.g. by use of the Model for assessment of telemedicine (MAST).

Health technology can be defined broadly as:

History
The discipline of HTA was first developed in the U.S. Office of Technology Assessment, which published its first report in 1976. The growth of HTA internationally can be seen in the expanding membership of the International Network of Agencies for Health Technology Assessment (INAHTA), a non-profit umbrella organization established in 1993. Organizations and individuals involved in the production of HTA publications may also affiliated with international societies such as Health Technology Assessment International (HTAi) and International Society for Pharmacoeconomics and Outcomes Research (ISPOR). Academic courses, typically in Masters programs, are also offered in health technology assessment and management.

By country

United Kingdom
The United Kingdom's National Institute for Health and Care Research (NIHR) runs several research programmes which may be viewed as falling into the realm of Health Technology Assessment. Of particular note is the NIHR Health Technology Assessment programme, its longest running, which undertakes both conventional HTA in the form of Evidence Synthesis and modelling, and evidence generation with a large portfolio of pragmatic RCTs and cohort studies. The programme's research is regularly published in NIHR's journal Health Technology Assessment.

Also in the UK, the Multidisciplinary Assessment of Technology Centre for Healthcare carries out HTA in collaboration with the health service, the NHS and various industrial partners.  MATCH is organised into four themes addressing key HTA topics including Health Economics, Tools for Industry, User Needs and Procurement and Supply chain.

Canada
Canada also has a health technology assessment body called the Canadian Agency for Drugs and Technologies in Health (CADTH)

Italy 
As of today, 11 Italian Regions have issued specific regional laws or regulations to manage HTA activities and processes at regional level: Abruzzo, Basilicata, Emilia-Romagna, Lazio, Liguria, Lombardia, Piemonte, Puglia, Sicilia, Toscana, and Veneto. In another 4 Regions (Calabria, Marche, Umbria, and Valle D’Aosta) and in the 2 autonomous Provinces of Bolzano and Trento, HTA is performed at different levels, even if no legislation has been produced yet.

The World Health organisation provides an overview of countries and their corresponding HTA agencies.

See also
 Horizon scanning
 Pharmacoeconomics

References

External links

 Health Technology Assessment International (HTAi)
  International Network of Agencies for Health Technology Assessment (INAHTA)

Impact assessment
Medical technology
Technology assessment
Life sciences industry